The Grand Mosque of Durrës (Albanian: Xhamia e Madhe) or New Mosque (Xhamia e Re) is a historic Albanian Mosque in the port-town of Durrës, Albania.

It was built in 1931 under the Kingdomship of King Ahmed Zogu on the site of an older mosque from Ottoman times. By the day of its opening, it was the largest mosque in Albania. The mosque was closed in 1967 under the dictatorship of Enver Hoxha and its minaret was torn down. Most other historic mosques of the Ottoman era were destroyed. From now on, the Main mosque was used as a so-called Youth Centre. It was damaged again in 1979 by an earthquake.

With the help of the International Islamic Relief Organization of the Muslim World League, the mosque was reopened again in 1993.

The Mosque is also called Grand Mosque in order to distinguish it from the Little Mosque - the Ottoman-era Fatih Mosque.

See also
Durrës
Tourism in Albania
Islam in Albania
Freedom of religion in Albania
Mosques in Albania
Architecture of Albania

References

Mosques in Albania
Mosques completed in 1993
1931 establishments in Albania
Buildings and structures in Durrës
Tourist attractions in Durrës County